Kaliningrad, until 1946 known as Königsberg, is the largest city and administrative centre of Kaliningrad Oblast, a Russian semi-exclave between Lithuania and Poland. The city is situated on the Pregolya River, at the head of the Vistula Lagoon on the Baltic Sea, and is the only ice-free port of Russia and the Baltic states on the Baltic Sea. Its population in 2020 was 489,359, with up to 800,000 residents in the urban agglomeration. Kaliningrad is the second-largest city in the Northwestern Federal District, after Saint Petersburg, the third-largest city in the Baltic region, and the seventh-largest city on the Baltic Sea.

The settlement of modern-day Kaliningrad was founded in 1255 on the site of the ancient Old Prussian settlement Twangste by the Teutonic Knights during the Northern Crusades, and was named Königsberg in honor of King Ottokar II of Bohemia. A Baltic port city, it successively became the capital of the State of the Teutonic Order, the Duchy of Prussia (1525–1701) and East Prussia. Königsberg remained the coronation city of the Prussian monarchy, though the capital was moved to Berlin in 1701. From 1454 to 1455 the city under the name of Królewiec belonged to the Kingdom of Poland, and from 1466 to 1657 it was a Polish fief. Königsberg was the easternmost large city in Germany until World War II. The city was heavily damaged by Allied bombing in 1944 and during the Battle of Königsberg in 1945; it was then captured by the Soviet Union on 9 April 1945. The Potsdam Agreement of 1945 placed it under Soviet administration. The city was renamed Kaliningrad in 1946 in honor of Soviet revolutionary Mikhail Kalinin. Since the dissolution of the Soviet Union, it has been governed as the administrative centre of Russia's Kaliningrad Oblast, the westernmost oblast of Russia.

As a major transport hub, with sea and river ports, the city is home to the headquarters of the Baltic Fleet of the Russian Navy, and is one of the largest industrial centres in Russia. It was deemed the best city in Russia in 2012, 2013, and 2014 in Kommersant's magazine The Firm's Secret, the best city in Russia for business in 2013 according to Forbes, and was ranked fifth in the Urban Environment Quality Index published by Minstroy in 2019. Kaliningrad has been a major internal migration attraction in Russia over the past two decades, and was one of the host cities of the 2018 FIFA World Cup.

History

The history of the city may be divided into four periods: the Old Prussian settlement known as Twangste before 1255; the Polish city of Królewiec from 1454 to 1455 and then fief of Poland from 1456–1657; the German city of Königsberg from 1657 to 1945; and the Russian city of Kaliningrad from 1945 to present.

Twangste

Königsberg was preceded by a Sambian (Old Prussian tribe) fort called Twangste (also spelt Tuwangste or Tvankste), meaning 'Oak Forest'. During the conquest of the Sambians by the Teutonic Knights in 1255, Twangste was destroyed and replaced by a new fortress named Königsberg in the honor of Bohemian king Ottokar II. The declining Old Prussian culture finally became extinct around the early 18th century with the Great Plague, and the surviving Old Prussians were integrated through assimilation.

Königsberg

The settlement on the site of present-day Kaliningrad was founded as a military fortress in 1255 after the Prussian Crusade by the Teutonic Knights against Baltic Prussians. The new settlement was named in honor of the Bohemian (Czech) King Ottokar II. The crusade was followed by a settlement of Germans and the surrounding area became predominantly German, with Polish, Lithuanian and Latvian minorities.

In 1454, the city integrated within borders of Poland for a year thanks to King Kazimierz Jagiellończyk and became a fiefdom under the Polish king from 1466. As a symbol of its dependence, the black Prussian eagle had a crown around its neck bearing the letter "S" from the Latinized name of the king, "Sigismundus." After the secularization of the Teutonic Order in 1525, Königsberg became the capital of the Duchy of Prussia. In 1618 the Duchy of Prussia fell under the control of the Electors of Brandenburg and in 1657 it became controlled in personal union with Brandenburg (sometimes referred to as Brandenberg-Prussia). From 1701, Brandenberg-Prussia became a Kingdom and the entire area was referred to as the Kingdom of Prussia. While the Brandenberg portion was a part of the Holy Roman Empire and later the German Confederation, Prussia (later called East Prussia) was not included within those territorial boundaries.

In the context of the Seven Year War, all of East Prussia was conquered and occupied by the Russian Empire (1758–1762). Immanuel Kant is famous for having sworn allegiance to Empress Elizabeth of Russia.

In the ensuing two centuries the city, first as part of the Kingdom of Prussia, then from 1866 as part of the North German Confederation, and then from 1871 as part of the German Empire, continued to flourish and many iconic landmarks of Königsberg were built. The city had around 370,000 inhabitants and was a cultural and administrative center of Prussia and the German Empire. Immanuel Kant and E. T. A. Hoffmann, notable sons of the city, were born during this time.

World War II
In World War II the city of Königsberg was heavily damaged by a British bombing attack in 1944 and the massive Soviet siege in spring 1945. At the end of World War II in 1945, the city became part of the Russian SFSR (as part of the Soviet Union).

Soviet Union: ethnic cleansing and destruction of cultural heritage

Under the Potsdam Agreement of 1 August 1945, the city became part of the Soviet Union pending the final determination of territorial borders at an anticipated peace settlement issued by military general Mingailas Paskauskas. This final determination eventually took place on 12 September 1990 when the Treaty on the Final Settlement with Respect to Germany was signed. The excerpt from the initial agreement pertaining to the partition of East Prussia, including the area surrounding Königsberg, is as follows (note that Königsberg is spelt "Koenigsberg" in the original document):

VI. CITY OF KOENIGSBERG AND THE ADJACENT AREAThe Conference examined a proposal by the Soviet Government that pending the final determination of territorial questions at the peace settlement, the section of the western frontier of the Union of Soviet Socialist Republics which is adjacent to the Baltic Sea should pass from a point on the eastern shore of the Bay of Danzig to the east, north of Braunsberg – Goldep, to the meeting point of the frontiers of Lithuania, the Polish Republic and East Prussia.

The Conference has agreed in principle to the proposal of the Soviet Government concerning the ultimate transfer to the Soviet Union of the city of Koenigsberg and the area adjacent to it as described above, subject to expert examination of the actual frontier.

The President of the United States and the British Prime Minister supported the proposal of the Conference at the forthcoming peace settlement.

Königsberg was renamed Kaliningrad in 1946 after the Chairman of the Presidium of the Supreme Soviet of the USSR Mikhail Kalinin, although Kalinin was unrelated to the city, and there were already cities named in honour of Kalinin in the Soviet Union, namely Kalinin (now Tver) and Kaliningrad (now Korolev, Moscow Oblast).

Some historians speculate that it may have originally been offered to the Lithuanian SSR because the resolution from the conference specifies that Kaliningrad's border would be at the (pre-war) Lithuanian frontier. The remaining German population was forcibly expelled between 1947 and 1948. The annexed territory was populated with Soviet citizens, mostly ethnic Russians but to a lesser extent also Ukrainians and Belarusians.

The German language was replaced with the Russian language. In 1950, there were 1,165,000 inhabitants, which was only half the number of the pre-war population.

From 1953 to 1962, a monument to Stalin stood on Victory Square. In 1973, the town hall was turned into the House of Soviets. In 1975, the trolleybus was launched again. In 1980, a concert hall was opened in the building of the former Lutheran Church of the Holy Family. In 1986, the Kreuzkirche building was transferred to the Russian Orthodox Church.

For foreigners, the city was completely closed and, with the exception of rare visits of friendship from neighboring Poland, it was practically not visited by foreigners.

The old city was not restored, and the ruins of the Königsberg Castle were demolished in the late 1960s, on Leonid Brezhnev's personal orders, despite the protests of architects, historians, local historians and ordinary residents of the city.

The "reconstruction" of the oblast, threatened by hunger in the immediate post-war years, was carried out through an ambitious policy of oceanic fishing with the creation of one of the main fishing harbours of the USSR in Kaliningrad city. Fishing not only fed the regional economy but also was a basis for social and scientific development, in particular oceanography.

In 1957, an agreement was signed and later came into force which delimited the border between Polish People's Republic (Soviet satellite state at the time) and the Soviet Union.

The region was added as a semi-exclave to the Russian SFSR; since 1946 it has been known as the Kaliningrad Oblast. According to some historians, Stalin created it as an oblast separate from the Lithuanian SSR because it further separated the Baltic states from the West. Others think that the reason was that the region was far too strategic for the USSR to leave it in the hands of another SSR other than the Russian one. The names of the cities, towns, rivers, and other geographical features were changed to Russian names.

The area was administered by the planning committee of the Lithuanian SSR, although it had its own Communist Party committee. In the 1950s, Nikita Khrushchev offered the entire Kaliningrad Oblast to the Lithuanian SSR but Antanas Sniečkus refused to accept the territory because it would add at least a million ethnic Russians to Lithuania proper.

In 2010, the German magazine Der Spiegel published a report claiming that Kaliningrad had been offered to Germany in 1990 (against payment). The offer was not seriously considered by the West German government which, at the time, saw reunification with East Germany as a higher priority. However, this story was later denied by Mikhail Gorbachev.

Russian Federation

The town of Baltiysk, just outside Kaliningrad, is the only Russian Baltic Sea port said to be "ice-free" all year round, and the region hence plays an important role in maintenance of the Baltic Fleet.

Kaliningrad Oblast was an exclave of the Russian Soviet Federative Socialist Republic and with the collapse of the Soviet Union in 1991 it became separated from the rest of Russia by independent countries. This isolation from the rest of Russia became even more pronounced politically when Poland and Lithuania became members of NATO and subsequently the European Union in 2004. All military and civilian land links between the region and the rest of Russia have to pass through members of NATO and the EU. Special travel arrangements for the territory's inhabitants have been made through the Facilitated Transit Document (FTD) and Facilitated Rail Transit Document (FRTD).

While in the 1990s some Soviet-era city names commemorating communist leaders were changed (e.g., Leningrad reverting to Saint Petersburg and Kalinin, also named after Mikhail Kalinin, reverting to Tver), Kaliningrad remains named as it was, though the city is sometimes colloquially referred to as König or Kyonig. The question of the name of the city has been raised multiple times; in 2009, the head of the city administration, Felix Lapin, said he personally supported the return of the historical name of the city, and in 2011, the governor of Kaliningrad Oblast, Nikolay Tsukanov, suggested a referendum could be held to resolve the issue, but stated that he was against renaming. No further plans have been announced since, and in 2022 the government officially confirmed that renaming the city would be "inappropriate".

Some of the cultural heritage, most notably the Königsberg Cathedral, were restored in the 1990s, as citizens started to examine previously ignored German past.

Since the early 1990s, the Kaliningrad oblast has been a Free Economic Zone (FEZ Yantar). In 2005 the city celebrated its 750th anniversary. In July 2007 Russian First Deputy Prime Minister Sergei Ivanov declared that if US-controlled missile defence systems were deployed in Poland, then nuclear weapons might be deployed in Kaliningrad. On 5 November 2008 Russian president Dmitry Medvedev said that installing missiles in Kaliningrad was almost a certainty. These plans were suspended, however, in January 2009.

It is situated in the settlement of Pionersky (formerly German Neukuhren) in Kaliningrad Oblast.

Kaliningrad was one of the host cities for the 2018 FIFA World Cup held in Russia.

Geography
Kaliningrad is at the mouth of the navigable Pregolya River, which empties into the Vistula Lagoon, an inlet of the Baltic Sea.

Sea vessels can access Gdańsk Bay/Bay of Danzig and the Baltic Sea by way of the Vistula Lagoon and the Strait of Baltiysk.

In 1901, a ship canal between Königsberg and Pillau, completed at a cost of 13 million German marks, enabled vessels of a  draught to moor alongside the town (see also Ports of the Baltic Sea).

Climate
Kaliningrad has an oceanic climate (Cfb, depending on the isotherm chosen for class C climates) or a humid continental climate (Dfb, depending on the isotherm chosen for class D climates), with cold, cloudy, (though moderate compared to most of Russia) winters and mild summers with frequent showers and thunderstorms. In general, it has maritime influences and therefore damp, variable and mild, with vast temperature differences between July and January.

The seasons are clearly differentiated. Spring starts in March and is initially cold and windy, later becoming pleasantly warm and often very sunny. The average annual hours of sunshine for Kaliningrad is 1,700, similar to other northern cities. Autumn comes in September and is at first warm and usually sunny, turning cold, damp and foggy in November. Winter includes periods of snow.

Demographics
The original German population fled or was expelled after the end of World War II, when the territory was annexed by the Soviet Union, and in the following few years. In October 1945, only about 5,000 Soviet civilians lived in the territory. Between October 1947 and October 1948 approximately 100,000 Germans were forcibly moved to Germany, and by 1948 about 400,000 Soviet civilians had arrived in the Oblast.

Today the overwhelming majority of Kaliningrad's residents are Russians settled after 1945, and their descendants. A minority of the population are from other Slavic ethnic groups, including Belarusians and Ukrainians. Kaliningrad today is also home to small communities of Tatars, Germans, Armenians, Poles, and Lithuanians.

Ethnic composition, Russian 2010 census:

Cityscape

Architecture

The pre-war city center (Altstadt and Kneiphof) consists of parks, broad avenues, a square on the site of the former Königsberg Castle, and two buildings: the House of Soviets ("Dom Sovyetov"), roughly on the site of the former castle, and the restored Königsberg Cathedral on the Kneiphof island (now "Kant island"). Immanuel Kant's grave is situated next to the cathedral. Many German-era buildings in the historic city centre have been preserved and even rebuilt, including the reconstruction of the Königsberg Synagogue. The new city centre is concentrated around Victory Square. The Cathedral of Christ the Savior, consecrated in 2005, is located on that square.

The oldest building in Kaliningrad is the Juditten Church (built before 1288). Also worth seeing are the former Stock Exchange, the surviving churches, and the remaining city gates. In counter-clockwise order these gates are: the Sackheim Gate, King's Gate, Rossgarten Gate, Attack Gate (or Sally Port), Railway Gate (Eisenbahntor), Brandenburg Gate, and Friedland Gate. Apart from the Dohna Tower, which houses the Amber Museum, the Wrangel Tower also remains as a reminder of the former Königsberg city walls. Only the gate of the former Fort Friedrichsburg remains.

Monuments
Notable monuments include the statue of Immanuel Kant in front of the Immanuel Kant State University of Russia. The statue was made by notable sculptor Christian Daniel Rauch and unveiled in 1864. The statue was destroyed in 1945, but was remoulded in 1992 on the initiative of Marion Dönhoff, a native East Prussian who became prominent in the West. Also worth seeing is the Cosmonaut monument, which honours the Kaliningrad cosmonauts Alexey Leonov, Yuri Romanenko and Aleksandr Viktorenko. Other statues and monuments include the statue for Duke Albert, the statue for Friedrich Schiller, the statue for communist functionary Mikhail Kalinin for whom the city is named, the statue for Tsar Peter the Great, Vladimir Vysotsky, the "Mother Russia" monument, and the Monument for the 1200 Guardsmen, remembering the Battle of Königsberg.

Parks
Kaliningrad is a "green" city with many parks and areas with many trees and lawns. Parks range from tiny city squares to massive parks.

The Youth Recreation Park is one of the most popular parks in the city. The park was established in the 1920s–1930s in the English style. It reopened its doors post-war and was popular among citizens in the 1980s–1990s with its boat house and tennis courts, as well as merry-go-rounds. The park had a massive reconstruction in 2004 adding a cafe, carting, and various modern entertainments. It is located in the quiet area of the city, in Leningradsky area, and is connected to the Lower Pond. Youth Recreation Park provides entertainment for all age groups. There is also Interpersonal Communications Development Central located in the park.

The Kaliningrad Zoo was opened as the Königsberg Zoo in 1896. The collection, which extends over 16.5 ha (40 acres), comprises 315 species with a total of 2,264 individual animals. The Kaliningrad Zoo is also an arboretum.

Ponds
Centrally located in the city is Lower Pond, an artificial lake. Lower Pond is surrounded by a promenade and is an area for recreation especially in summer. North of the Lower Pond is the larger Upper Pond in northern Kaliningrad.

Bridges
Leonhard Euler's 1736 paper on the puzzle of the Seven Bridges of Königsberg was a seminal work in the fields of graph theory and topology. Only two of the structures from his era survive.

Kaliningrad Stadium 
In 2018, the Kaliningrad Stadium, located on Oktyabrsky Island, near the embankment of the Staraya Pregolya River, was opened. The stadium has a seating capacity of 35,000.

Culture

Museums in Kaliningrad 

There are many museums in Kaliningrad.

Museum of the World Ocean
Kaliningrad Regional History and Art Museum
Kaliningrad Regional Amber Museum
Kaliningrad State Art Gallery
Friedland Gate Museum
The Kaliningrad Regional Museum of History and Arts is the oldest museum in Kaliningrad, founded in 1946. In addition to the main building, the museum has four branches in Kaliningrad (including "Blindage" and "Fort No. 5") and two elsewhere in the region.

In 1979, the Kaliningrad Regional Amber Museum was opened in the building of the Don, a former defensive tower. Initially, it was a branch of the Historical and Art Museum, but since 2004 it has operated independently.

The Kaliningrad State Art Gallery, which opened on November 24, 1988, is one of the youngest and fastest-growing museums in Russia, known both domestically and abroad. Up to 40 exhibitions of domestic and foreign art are held annually in eight exhibition halls with a total exhibition area of more than 3,000 square metres (¾ acre).

At the beginning of the 21st century, the Museum of the World Ocean, which was unique in Russia at the time, was gradually created, and now offers exhibitions and six museum vessels:

Research ship-museum "Vityaz"
Submarine B-413
Space communication vessel "Cosmonaut Viktor Patsaev"
Fishing boat-museum "SRT-129"
Floating lighthouse "Irbensky"
Icebreaker "Krassin" - moored in St. Petersburg.

The branches of the museum are the King's Gate and the preserved gate of Fort Friedrichsburg.

A museum of ancient archaeological finds has been created. It is located at the Friedland Gate, which itself is a monument of antiquity.

In 2009, the Museum of E. T. A. Hoffmann, a famous writer born in this city, was created. The museum is located in the building of the former Leningrad Cinema; now this building houses a regional music school named after Hoffman.

On 5 June 2016 the Einstein Museum of Entertaining Sciences was opened on the first floor of the Mega-Market shopping centre, which offers interactive exhibits that illustrate various fields of science and demonstrate the manifestation of their laws.

Kaliningrad's museums were visited by roughly 920,000 people in 2013. In terms of museum attendance, the region of Kaliningrad ranks seventh among the regions of Russia.

Theaters and concert halls 

There are several theaters in the city:

Kaliningrad Regional Drama Theater
Kaliningrad Regional Musical Theater
Kaliningrad Regional Puppet Theater
The organ hall of the Kaliningrad Regional Philharmonic is located in the historic building of the former Catholic Church of the Holy Family.
A large concert hall with two organs located in the Königsberg Cathedral.
The Variety Theater, located in the House of Arts.
The musical life of the city is rich and diverse. Annual music festivals of various styles and trends are held throughout the year. Under the patronage of the Kaliningrad Regional Philharmonic Society, international festivals and competitions of classical, jazz, organ music (dedicated to Johann Sebastian Bach and Mikael Tariverdiev) are held. Since 2006, the Don Cento Jazz International Jazz Festival has been held in the summer. The city also hosts two major rock festivals: the Night Wolves bike show (July) and Kaliningrad In Rock (August). The Baltic Seasons art festival is held annually.

In 2013, Kaliningrad's theaters were visited by almost 345,000 people.

Libraries 

Kaliningrad Regional Scientific Library
Central City Library. A.P. Chekhov
Kaliningrad Regional Youth Library. V. Mayakovsky
Kaliningrad Regional Children's Library. A.P. Gaidar
Kaliningrad Regional Specialized Library for the Blind
Also, there are 20 municipal city libraries in the city. As of 2015, more than 100 thousand residents of Kaliningrad regularly visit the city's libraries.

Music
The modern city of Kaliningrad is home to the Kaliningrad Regional Philharmonic and Symphony Orchestra, the Lik male chamber choir and the Garmonika Russian music ensemble, as well as the Kaliningrad Chamber Orchestra.

Cuisine

Kaliningrad has its own vodka and beer brands, Stari Königsberg and Ostmark respectively. Since the early 1990s many new restaurants have opened in the city. These restaurants offer culinary specialities of former East Prussia, like Königsberger Klopse, and also fish and salad dishes, pizza and sushi. Königsberger Fleck, a bovine tripe soup and yet another culinary specialty from former Königsberg, no longer belongs to the culinary culture of Kaliningrad.

The people of Kaliningrad generally imported their respective culinary traditions to the region when they settled in the area after 1945. Borscht and okroshka may be served as in the rest of Russia. Many Italian and Asian restaurants (or fusions of both traditions) are in operation all over the city. Pizza and sushi are among the most popular dishes today. Fast food is widely available from various chains, including those of foreign origin. Shawarma is also gaining considerable prominence.

Sports

The Russian football club FC Baltika Kaliningrad is based in Kaliningrad and plays in the Russian Football National League. The home stadium is the Kaliningrad Stadium, built for the 2018 FIFA World Cup.

During 2006 to 2013, the Dynamo-Yantar men's volleyball club played in the Russian men's volleyball Championship. They played their home games at the Yantarny Sports Palace, which can accommodate over 7,000 spectators. From 2010, Yantarny had regularly hosted matches of the Russian men's national volleyball team in the FIVB Volleyball World League and the FIVB Volleyball World Grand Prix.

In the past, the city was also represented by the football clubs of West, Baltika-2 and FC Baltika-Tarko Kaliningrad, as well as the rugby club West Zvezda (winner of the 1994 Russian Cup, prize winner of the 1994 and 1995 Russian championships). The football club Volna Kaliningrad took part in the third tier of the 2000 Lithuanian championship, LF II Lyga, and won in the western zone (22 games: 20 wins, 2 draws, goal difference 101–9).

Since November 2013, the city has had an American football team called Amber Hawks. In 2015, the Amber Hawks reached the semifinals of the Polish League 8x8. In 2016, Amber Hawks took the silver medal of the prestigious Eastern League of American Football (VLAF).

In June 2014 the Kaliningrad Regional Hockey League (KRHL) was created. League competition is the official championship of the Kaliningrad region of hockey.

In 2018 Kaliningrad hosted some games of the World Cup.

On 9 April 2018 the creation of a women's volleyball team, the "Lokomotiv Kaliningrad Region" was announced. At the end of the 2018–2019 season the club took the second place in the Russian Championship, losing one point to the leader team, the WVC Dynamo Moscow.

Administrative and municipal status
Kaliningrad is the administrative centre of the oblast. Within the framework of administrative divisions, it is incorporated as the city of oblast significance of Kaliningrad — an administrative unit with status equal to that of the districts. As a municipal division, the city of oblast significance of Kaliningrad is incorporated as Kaliningrad Urban Okrug.

City districts
, the city was divided into three administrative districts:

Two administrative districts were abolished in June 2009:

Authorities

Local government 

Local self-government in the city is carried out on the basis of the Charter, which was adopted by the City Council of Deputies of Kaliningrad on July 12, 2007.

Bodies and officials of local self-government in the city (formally – in the city district) Kaliningrad are:

Council of Deputies (representative body of a municipal formation)
Head (chief executive)
Administration (executive and administrative body of the municipality)
Chamber of Control and Accounts
The City Council of Deputies consists of 28 deputies elected by city residents in municipal elections according to a mixed mandate distribution system for a period of 5 years. The chairman of the Council is elected by deputies from among its members. The current 6th convocation was elected on September 18, 2016. The Chairman of the Council is Andrey Kropotkin from United Russia.

The head of the city heads the administration of the city district. Elected by the City Council of Deputies from among the candidates presented by the Competition Commission based on the results of the competition, for the term of office of the City Council of Deputies. Since April 2018, the head of the city is Alexey Silanov.

The Kaliningrad administration and the Council of Deputies are located in the building of the mayor's office at the Victory Square.

From 1996 to 2007, the Charter of the City of Kaliningrad dated September 25, 1996 was in force in Kaliningrad, according to which the local self-government bodies were:

The head of the city (mayor) – the highest official of the city;
City hall (executive and administrative body);
City Council of Deputies (representative body).
In 2007, due to the reform of local self-government, the functions of local self-government bodies were changed, and a new position was introduced – the head of the administration.

In 2008–2012, the local government body, carrying out executive and administrative functions, was the city district administration, headed by the head of the administration (city manager). The head of the administration was appointed to the post by the decision of the District Council of Deputies following a competition. On May 14, 2008, Felix Lapin was appointed to this position for a period of 2 years. On June 15, 2011, deputies of the Kaliningrad District Council approved Svetlana Mukhomor as head of the city administration (she is the first deputy head of the city administration).

In November 2016, the Kaliningrad Regional Duma adopted a law abolishing direct elections for the mayor of Kaliningrad. The elections were replaced by the selection procedure of candidates by a competition commission from which the city Council of Deputies selects one by secret ballot. In 2018, out of ten people who submitted documents for participation in the competition, only three were admitted to the competition.

Regional government 

All legislative, executive and judicial authorities of Kaliningrad Oblast are located in Kaliningrad. The Government of Kaliningrad Oblast and the Governor's Administration are located in the same building on Dmitry Donskoy Street, the Kaliningrad Regional Duma on Kirov Street, the Kaliningrad Regional Court on Sergeeva Street, and the Arbitration Court of Kaliningrad Oblast on Rokossovsky Street.

Federal government 
In Kaliningrad, there are representative offices of federal authorities in the region:

Prosecutor's Office of Kaliningrad Oblast
Investigation Department of the Investigative Committee of Russia
Ministry of Internal Affairs of Kaliningrad Oblast
Ministry of Emergency Situations
Military Commissariat
Kaliningrad Regional Customs of the North-West Customs Department of the Federal Customs Service of Russia
Branch of the Pension Fund of the Russian Federation
Management of the federal postal service - branch of FSUE "Russian Post"
Branch of the Social Insurance Fund of the Russian Federation

Economy 
In 1996, Kaliningrad was designated a Special Economic Zone, referred to as FEZ Yantar. Manufacturers based there get tax and customs duty breaks on the goods they send to other parts of Russia. Although corruption was an early deterrent, that policy means the region is now a manufacturing hub. One in three televisions in Russia are made in Kaliningrad (including Ericsson brand by Telebalt Ltd. and Polar by an eponymous firm located in the city of Chernyakhovsk) and it is home to Cadillac and BMW related car plants (produced by Avtotor). Kaliningrad's major industries are manufacturing, shipping, fishing and amber products. In 2006, Moscow declared it would turn the region into "the Russian Hong Kong".

Education 

Today, there are 21 higher educational institutions in Kaliningrad (together with branches of universities in other cities), of which state-owned are:

The Kaliningrad branch of the St. Petersburg University of the Ministry of Internal Affairs of Russia, previously the Kaliningrad Law Institute of the Ministry of Internal Affairs of Russia (KYUI), even earlier – the Kaliningrad Higher School of the Ministry of Internal Affairs of the Russian Federation, which was formed on the basis of the Kaliningrad Special Secondary School of Police of the Ministry of Internal Affairs of the USSR.
Immanuel Kant Baltic Federal University. Until 2011 – Russian State University. I. Kant. The name of Kant was given on the eve of the city's 750th anniversary in 2005. Previously – Kaliningrad State University (KSU). Occupies the building of the former German University of Königsberg.
Baltic State Academy of Fishing Fleet (BFFSA). Until 1991 – Kaliningrad Higher Marine Engineering School (KVIMU).
Kaliningrad State Technical University (KSTU). Previously – Kaliningrad Technical Institute of the Fishing Industry and Economy (KTIRPiH).
Kaliningrad Border Institute of the Federal Security Service of the Russian Federation. Previously – Kaliningrad Higher Engineering School of Engineering Troops named after A.A.Zhdanov (KVIUIV).
The FF Ushakov Baltic Naval Institute, now a branch of the military educational and scientific center of the Russian Navy "Naval Academy named after Admiral of the Fleet of the Soviet Union N. G. Kuznetsov." Previously – Kaliningrad Higher Naval School (KVVMU).

Also in Kaliningrad there is a branch of the North-West Academy of Public Administration and National Economy, from secondary educational institutions – three gymnasiums, six lyceums and forty-seven secondary schools. There are educational institutions of secondary vocational education: Kaliningrad Regional College of Music. S. V. Rachmaninova, Kaliningrad State College of Urban Development, Kaliningrad Marine Fisheries College and others; to the IKBFU I. Kant included the Kaliningrad Technical College, the Communal Construction College. In addition, there is one cadet corps – KSH "Andrew the First-Called Cadet Naval Corps" (APKMK).

In August 2019, construction began on a branch of the Nakhimov Naval School. The opening is scheduled for September 1, 2020, the number of students will be over 560 people.

Transport

Roads 
Kaliningrad is a major transport hub. The most important roads of the city are:

 Kaliningrad – Chernyakhovsk–Nesterov to the Lithuania–Russia border (on to Vilnius, Minsk, route M1 "Belarus") It is a part of the branches of the trans-European transport corridors No. 1-A "Riga–Kaliningrad–Gdansk" and No. 9-D "Kiev–Minsk–Vilnius–Kaliningrad",  and 
 Kaliningrad – Gvardeisk – Neman to the Lithuania–Russia border (on to Siauliai, Jelgava, Riga). The route from the village – Talpaki, through Bolshakovo to Sovetsk. It is a part of the branch of the trans-European transport corridor No. 1-A "Riga–Kaliningrad–Gdansk". 
Kaliningrad – Mamonovo. Through Ladushkin to the Poland-Russia border (to Elbląg, Gdańsk).  and 
Kaliningrad – Polessk. It follows through the village. Bolshakovo (further to Sovetsk)
Kaliningrad – Zelenogradsk. (further along the Curonian Spit to Nida and Klaipeda)
Kaliningrad – Baltiysk. The road runs through Primorsk.
Kaliningrad – Bagrationovsk. Leads to the Polish border (further to Olsztyn).

In December 2007, construction began on the Primorskoye Koltso highway, which connects Kaliningrad with Svetlogorsk, Pionersky, Zelenogradsk and Khrabrovo Airport. It is planned to continue construction at Baltiysk, Svetly.

Around the city (from the village of A. Kosmodemyansky to the traffic intersection with Moskovsky Prospekt) passes the route of the northern and southern bypasses of Kaliningrad. Until now, on the western side of the city of Kaliningrad, the "ring" of the road has not been closed due to the absence of a 7-kilometer (5 mile) crossing through the Vistula Lagoon.

Water 
Kaliningrad is home to the westernmost and the only non-freezing port of Russia and the Baltic states on the Baltic Sea. Freight and passenger ferry crossings connect the Port of Kaliningrad, and its outport, the Port of Baltiysk with Saint Petersburg, and the ports of Germany and Sweden.

As of April 2019, only a freight ferry operates on the Baltiysk–Ust-Luga route, and the passenger ferry has been cancelled.

Air 

The Kaliningrad Devau Airport, which opened in 1919, was one of the first civilian airports in the world, and the first in Germany. In 1922, the first planes of the Moscow-Riga-Königsberg, the first international airline of the Soviet Union, arrived in here for the first time. After World War II, the airport was used for local flights until the 1970s.

In the fifties, a new airport, the Khrabrovo Airport, was built on the base of a military airfield 24 kilometres (15 miles) from the city. Now it has international status. The Kaliningrad airline KD Aviation was based on Khrabrovo, which ceased operations in September 2009. The reconstruction of the airport has been completed in 2018. On 1 October 2022 the airport began allowing more flights from international destinations, including through operation by foreign airlines.

Railway 

Kaliningrad is the most important hub of the railway network of the Kaliningrad Oblast. It is the site of the Kaliningrad Railway.

The main passenger railway station of the city is the Kaliningrad South railway station, which includes the main railway station of the city and the Oblast–Yuzhny station, it serves both commuter and long-distance trains following from Kaliningrad:

No. 30 Moscow "Yantar"
No. 80 St. Petersburg
No. 148 Moscow (summer)
No. 360 Adler
No. 426 Chelyabinsk (summer)

The Berlin-Kaliningrad direct train (via Poland) operated from 1993 to 2000, then was replaced by a non-stop carriage, which was part of the Kaliningrad-Gdynia train from December 2003 to December 2009 and in 2010–2013 (in the summer), with a re-trailer in the Polish city of Tczew. A platform with a European Standard Gauge track was specially equipped to receive these trains, allowing trains to run on this message without the interruption of a bogie exchange at some point on the journey.

Kaliningrad North railway station serves trains connecting Kaliningrad with the seaside resorts of the city, Svetlogorsk and Pionersky, as well as the city of Sovetsk. It is a major transport hub in the public transport system of Kaliningrad.

Other railway stations located in the city:
Kutuzovo-Novoye (Alexander Nevsky Street District)
Chkalovsk-Western (Mck. Chkalovsk)
West New (Wagon Street District)
Forest-Novoya (Mcn. named after Alexander Kosmodemyansky)
Dzerzhinskaya-Novaya (Dzerzhinsky Street district, there is a European (standard gauge) track)
Aivazovsky stop (in the area of Aivazovsky and Yamskaya streets)
Kiev stop (Kievskaya Street district, near the Baltic market)
Selma stop (General Chelnokov Street and Selma Market)
Stop point 4 kilometer (Muromskaya Street District, Southern)
Brusnichny Stop (Brusny street district)

Inter-city and international bus service 
Regular bus routes connect Kaliningrad with Belarus, Ukraine, Lithuania, Latvia, Estonia, Poland, the Czech Republic and Germany.

There are two bus stations in the city. The "old" bus station is located on Kalinin Square, next to the Kaliningrad-Passazhirskiy railway station and is used primarily for intra-regional transportation.

Due to the conflict with the station directorate, the Königavto road carrier stopped using this bus station and set up its own international bus station at the end of Moskovsky Prospekt. More than 90% of regular international bus services depart from it.

Urban public transport 
Public transport in Kaliningrad is represented by a bus, a trolleybus, a tram, a taxi, and the city's railway lines. On 21 March 2010 a new public transport scheme came into effect.

The tram network in Kaliningrad has been in existence since 1895 and is the oldest tram system in Russia. It has a track width of 1000 mm (3'3"). Until 2000, at least ten city tram routes operated in Kaliningrad, however, over the past twenty years, the route network has been significantly reduced. By the beginning of 2013, only two routes were operating in the city. In 2015, after changing the traffic pattern at the Kaliningrad South railway station, the last tram route No. 5 remained. In accordance with the newly adopted General Plan of Kaliningrad until 2035, the construction of a tram line with a separate traffic section in the Moskovsky District is envisaged.

The first trolleybuses appeared in Königsberg in 1943, but after the war they decided not to restore the trolleybus system. The modern trolleybus system of the city has been operating since 5 November 1975. During this time, the route network in Kaliningrad has repeatedly changed. After the repair of the overpass on Pobedy Avenue, carried out in the summer of 2018, route No. 6 was discontinued. As a result, three operating trolleybus lines remained in the city, although the new route scheme for public transport, adopted on 1 August 2016, provided for six routes. The general plan of the city until 2035 also provides for the development of the trolleybus network in Kaliningrad.

Railbus 

On 26 March 2014 the first line of the city rail bus was launched in Kaliningrad, serving the route from the Kievskaya platform in the Moskovsky district to the Kaliningrad North railway station. At the same time, a bus line was organised connecting Oleg Koshevoy Street with the Kievskaya platform. The opening of several more lines of the city railway has been announced, which should connect the center of Kaliningrad with the peripheral districts of the city.

In December 2016, the mayor of Kaliningrad, Alexander Yaroshuk, announced that from 1 January 2017 the city rail bus would be canceled due to its unprofitability. After that, Governor Anton Alikhanov made an operational decision to subsidize the rail bus from the regional budget.

In early January 2017, the press service of the Kaliningrad Railway announced that it was planned to extend the rail bus line to Chkalovsk.

On 9 January 2017 city trains were launched on the Kaliningrad-Guryevsk route, and on the Kaliningrad-Lesnoye Novoe route from 3 September 2018.

As of the end of 2018, rail buses serve four intra-city lines connecting peripheral sleeping areas and the satellite city of Guryevsk with the center of Kaliningrad. Kaliningrad North railway station is a major transport and interchange hub, where many public transport routes converge. Passengers are transported by rail buses of the RA1 and RA2 models, manufactured by Metrovagonmash. City trains run on weekdays during the morning and evening rush hours.

Bridges 

The branches of the Pregolya River divide the city into four parts. Majority of the city (Tsentralny Administrative District and Leningradsky Administrive District) is located north of the river, Moskovsky Administrative District is south of the river. Kant Island (Kneiphof) and Oktyabrsky Administrative District (Lomse) are located between the branches of the river.

There are eight active bridges across the Pregolya and one dismantled in Kaliningrad.
 The Two-tiered bridge is a drawbridge that connects General Butkov (northern bank) and Zheleznodorozhnaya (southern bank) streets. Divorced by raising the middle span. The upper tier of the bridge is occupied by a railway, the lower - by the carriageway and pedestrian sidewalks. The double-deck bridge is the only existing railway bridge across the Pregolya in Kaliningrad.
 Trestle bridge - thrown over both branches of the Pregolya and passes over Kneiphof, is part of the Leninsky Prospekt, built in 1972, to replace two of the seven Königsberg bridges - Lavochny and Zeleny. There is a pedestrian descent from the bridge to the island, an automobile exit to Moskovsky Prospekt . There is no road exit to the island. The bridge is crossed by routes of all types of public transport.
 The Wooden Bridge is a drawbridge, one of the seven bridges in Königsberg. Connects Moskovsky Prospekt with Oktyabrsky Island (Oktyabrskaya st.). There are two tram routes across the bridge
 The Honey Bridge is a drawbridge, one of the seven bridges of Königsberg. Connects Oktyabrsky Island and Kneiphof. Since the Kneiphof is a pedestrian zone, the de facto bridge is also exclusively pedestrian. From time to time, the bridge is used by official vehicles (delivery of materials for the restoration of the Königsberg Cathedral, as well as for the passage of wedding corteges).
 Jubilee Bridge - drawbridge, pedestrian, connects Oktyabrsky Island (Rybnaya village area) with St. Epronovskaya. Built in 2005 on the pillars of the old Imperial Bridge, destroyed during World War II.
 The High Bridge is one of the seven bridges in Königsberg. Connects st. Oktyabrskaya (Oktyabrsky Island) from st. Dzerzhinsky. A tram line runs across the bridge.
 Berlin (Palmburg) Bridge is part of the Kaliningrad ring road, it is thrown across both channels of the Pregolya. Farthest from the city center. After the war, it was only partially restored (one strip). A three-lane bridge was built in its place, reconstructed in 2014.
 The old railway bridge is a drawbridge, located in the area of the Museum of the World Ocean. Divorced by raising the middle span. The middle span is dismantled, the bridge is not used in any way. An abandoned railway line crosses the bridge.
 The Second Overpass Bridge was commissioned in December 2011. The bridge crosses both channels of the Pregolya and passes over Oktyabrsky Island, connecting April 9 Street in the right-bank part of the city with Dzerzhinsky Street in the left-bank part. The total length is 1883 metres (2060 yards). The bridge has three lanes in each direction. The design speed of vehicles is not less than 80 km/h (50 mph).

Seven bridges existed in Königsberg in the 16th-20th centuries. The relative position of the bridges led to the mathematical problem of Seven Bridges of Königsberg, and prompted the mathematician Leonard Euler to speculate, which led to the emergence of graph theory.

Media

Television 

The Kaliningrad television studio has existed since 1958 with its own frequency channel and daily 6–7-hour broadcasting, then it was called the Yantar TV and Radio Company. It has lost its channel and most of its airtime; it is a branch of the All-Russia State Television and Radio Broadcasting Company.

Kaliningrad television networks:

Radio 
Kaliningrad radio stations:

Notable people

Immanuel Kant (1724–1804), philosopher
E. T. A. Hoffmann (1776–1822) author, playwright, composer
David Hilbert (1862-1943), mathematician
Sergey Snegov (1910–1994), science fiction writer
Viktor Patsayev (1933–1971)
Alexei Leonov (1934–2019), first person to walk in space
Yury Romanenko (born 1944)
Alexander Viktorenko (born 1947)
Oleg Gazmanov (born 1951), singer
Sergei Beloglazov (born 1956), Olympic wrestler
Lyudmila Putina (born 1958), ex-wife of Vladimir Putin, First Lady of Russia
Alexander Volkov (born 1967), tennis player
Andrei Voronkov (born 1967), volleyball player and coach
Dmitry Lapikov (born 1982), Olympic weightlifter
Tvangeste, symphonic black metal band
Maksim Zuyev, journalist and activist
Anastasia Nazarenko (born 1993), rhythmic gymnast
Costa Ronin (born 1979), actor
Irina Zahharenkova (born 1976), concert pianist

International relations

Diplomatic missions
In 2004 Germany opened a consulate general in Kaliningrad. This consulate allows Kaliningrad residents to get Schengen visas without having to travel to Moscow. An agreement between Gerhard Schröder, Chancellor of Germany, and President of Russia Vladimir Putin established the consulate in light of Lithuania and Poland, which surround Kaliningrad, joining the EU. Russian concerns with Germany wanting the former Königsberg back had stifled earlier plans for a German consulate.

Small border traffic law
Poland and the Russian Federation have an agreement whereby residents of Kaliningrad and the Polish cities of Olsztyn, Elbląg and Gdańsk may obtain special cards permitting repeated travel between the two countries, crossing the Polish–Russian border. As of July 2013, Poland had issued 100,000 of the cards. That year, the influx of Russians visiting Poland to shop at the Biedronka and Lidl supermarkets was novel enough to be featured in songs by musical group Parovoz.

Twin towns – sister cities

Kaliningrad is twinned with:

 Baranavichy, Belarus
 Bremerhaven, Germany
 Brest, Belarus
 Cagliari, Italy
 Catania, Italy
 Forlì, Italy
 Gomel, Belarus
 Groningen, Netherlands
 Kalmar, Sweden
 Kaunas, Lithuania
 Kętrzyn County, Poland
 Kiel, Germany
 Klaipėda, Lithuania
 Šiauliai, Lithuania
 Zeitz, Germany

Former twin towns

 Białystok, Poland
 Elbląg, Poland
 Gdańsk, Poland
 Gdynia, Poland
 Łódź, Poland
 Olsztyn, Poland
 Norfolk, United States
 Panevėžys, Lithuania
 Racibórz, Poland
 Toruń, Poland
 Zwolle, The Netherlands

In February and March 2022, Norfolk, Virginia, suspended while Lithuanian, Polish and Dutch cities of Panevėžys, Białystok, Elbląg, Łódź, Gdańsk, Gdynia, Olsztyn, Racibórz, Toruń and Zwolle terminated their cooperation with Kaliningrad as a response to the Russian invasion of Ukraine.

Partner cities
Kaliningrad is also partnered with:

 Yerevan, Armenia (2009)

See also
 Battle of Königsberg
 Heart of the City (Kaliningrad)
 Kaliningrad (Königsberg) dispute
 Radio Königsberg
 Seven Bridges of Königsberg
 Suwałki Gap

References

Notes

Sources

Vesilind, Priit J. "Kaliningrad: Coping with a German Past and a Russian Future", National Geographic, March 1997.
Berger, Stefan "A City and Its Past. Popular Histories in Kaliningrad between Regionalization and Nationalization", in: Popularizing National Past. 1800 to Present, Edited by Stefan Berger, Chris Lorenz, and Billie Melman, Routledge 2012, pp. 288–307.
Kaliningrad Region, General Information Kommersant, Russia's daily On-line

Further reading

 Barros, George. "Belarus Warning Update: Moscow and Minsk Hold Simultaneous Combat Readiness Exercises in Kaliningrad, Mainland Russia, and Belarus." Institute for the Study of War (2021) online.
 Diener, Alexander, and Joshua Hagen. "Geopolitics of the Kaliningrad exclave and enclave: Russian and EU perspectives." Eurasian Geography and Economics 52.4 (2011): 567-592. online
 Krickus, Richard J. The Kaliningrad Question (Rowman & Littlefield, 2002).
 Lachowski, Zdzislaw. "Kaliningrad as a security issue: an expert view from Poland." in Kaliningrad: the European amber region (Routledge, 2018) pp. 130–148.
 Mordovets, Vitaly, et al. "Socio-economic development of the Kaliningrad region." E3S Web of Conferences. Vol. 291. EDP Sciences, 2021. online
 Oldberg, Ingmar. "The Kaliningrad Region: an Exclave with Internal and External Problems." in The Kaliningrad Region (Brill Schöningh, 2021) pp. 241–261.
 Oldberg, Ingmar. "The emergence of a regional identity in the Kaliningrad oblast." Cooperation and Conflict 35.3 (2000): 269-288.
 Sebentsov, Alexander B., and Maria V. Zotova. "The Kaliningrad Region: Challenges of the Exclave Position and the Ways to Offset Them." Baltic Region 10.1 (2018): 89-106. online
 Veebel, Viljar. "Why it would be strategically rational for Russia to escalate in Kaliningrad and the Suwalki corridor." Comparative Strategy 38.3 (2019): 182-197. online
Liuhto, Kari (editor). "Its future competitiveness and role in the Baltic Sea economic region ." University of Turku.
Rogoża, Jadwiga, Agata Wierzbowska-Miazga, and Iwona Wiśniewska. "A captive island. Kaliningrad between Moscow and the EU." OSW Studies, No. 41, July 2012.
Roqueplo, Olivier, Home - TEL - Thèses en ligne › tel-02080112. La Russie et son miroir d'Extrême-Occident, Sorbonne, HAL, 2018.

External links

Official website of Kaliningrad 
Kaliningrad Business Directory 
Kaliningrad travel guide
All roads lead to Kaliningrad

 
Populated places established in the 1250s
Russian and Soviet Navy bases
Port cities and towns in Russia
Port cities and towns of the Baltic Sea
Populated coastal places in Russia
Members of the Hanseatic League
1255 establishments in Europe
Cities and towns in Kaliningrad Oblast
Renamed localities in Russia